Michael Kevin Paré (born October 9, 1958) is an American actor. He is best known for his roles in the films Eddie and the Cruisers (1983), Streets of Fire (1984), and The Philadelphia Experiment (1984), and on the series Starhunter (2000-2004).

Early life
Paré was born in Brooklyn, New York, the son of Joan and Francis Paré, who owned print shops. He has six sisters and three brothers. Paré's father was of French-Canadian ancestry. His father died from leukemia when Paré was five, leaving his mother to raise the large family of children.

Growing up Paré was a fan of James Dean, Marlon Brando, Montgomery Clift, Paul Newman, and Robert Mitchum, and felt he was "a kindred spirit" to them. He was working as a chef in New York City when he met talent agent Yvette Bikoff, who convinced him to try acting. In the early 1980s, he studied acting under Uta Hagen. He shot a series of television commercials in Japan.

He also worked as a model. In August 1987, he appeared on the cover of the first issue of Men's Fitness. In 2017, it was ranked among Men's Journal'''s thirty best magazine covers.

Career
His first starring role was as Tony Villicana on the television series The Greatest American Hero. His best-known film roles were as Eddie Wilson in Eddie and the Cruisers (1983) and its sequel Eddie and the Cruisers II: Eddie Lives! (1989), as well as Streets of Fire (1984) and The Philadelphia Experiment (1984). Paré also appeared in the 2012 remake of The Philadelphia Experiment. He starred as a tortured soldier named Brad Cartowski in the 1993 action film Deadly Heroes, directed by Menahem Golan. Other films included Moon 44 (1990), Village of the Damned (1995), Bad Moon (1996), Hope Floats (1998), and The Virgin Suicides (1999).

Paré is best known for his deep, raspy voice, muscular physique, rugged screen presence, and classic action hero demeanour. In his 2017 interview for Men's Journal he revealed that as a young actor he wasn't sure if he wanted to make a career as “the muscular leading guy", and instead tried to follow in the footsteps of his idols — Marlon Brando and James Dean.

Paré won the Best Actor award at PollyGrind Film Festival for the film Road to Hell, playing again the role of Tom Cody.

On television, Paré starred with Michael Beck in the drama Houston Knights in 1987–1988 as well as the 2001 television series Starhunter. The actor frequently appears in Uwe Boll's works.

In 2022, it was announced that Paré will be starring in the horror film Camp Pleasant Lake with Jonathan Lipnicki.

Personal life
He has married three times. His first wife (1980–1984) was film producer Lisa Katselas; his second wife, Marisa Roebuck (1986–1988); his present wife (since 1992) is Marjolein Booy, a former fashion model, with whom he has one child. Paré stated that he lives "a good, clean life", and trains frequently. He lives in California.

Filmography

 Crazy Times (1981) as Harry
 The Greatest American Hero (1981–1983) as Tony Villicana
 Eddie and the Cruisers (1983) as Eddie Wilson
 Undercover (1983) as Max
 Streets of Fire (1984) as Tom Cody
 The Philadelphia Experiment (1984) as David Herdeg
 Space Rage (1985) as Grange
 Instant Justice (1986) as Scott Youngblood
 The Women's Club (1987) as Patrick
 World Gone Wild (1988) as George Landon
 Houston Knights (1987–1988) as Sergeant Joey La Fiamma
 Eddie and the Cruisers II: Eddie Lives! (1989) as Eddie Wilson / Joe West
 Dragonfight (1990) as Moorpark
 Moon 44 (1990) as Felix Stone
 Il sole buio (1990) as Ruggero Brickman
 The Closer (1990) as Larry Freed
 Empire City (1991) as Joey Andre
 Killing Streets (1991) as Chris Brandt / Craig Brandt
 The Last Hour (1991) as Jeff
 Into the Sun (1992) as Captain Paul Watkins
 Blink of an Eye (1992) as Sam Browning
 Sunset Heat (1992) as Eric Wright
 Point of Impact (1993) as Jack Davis
 Deadly Heroes (1993) as Brad Cartowski
 Warriors (1994) as Colin Neal
 Carver's Gate (1995) as Carver
 Lunarcop (1995) as Joe Brody
 Village of the Damned (1995) as Frank McGowan
 Triplecross (1995) as Teddy "T.C." Cooper
 The Dangerous (1995) as Random
 Raging Angels (1995) as Colin
 The Colony (1996) as Alec Harken
 Coyote Run (1996) as Pershing Quinn
 Bad Moon (1996) as Ted Harrison
 Merchant of Death (1997) as Jim Randell
 2103: The Deadly Wake (1997) as Tarkis
 Strip Search (1997) as Robby Durrell
 Falling Fire (1997) as Daryl Boden
 Hope Floats (1998) as Bill Pruitt
 Back to Even (1998) as Boyle
 October 22 (1998) as Gary
 The Virgin Suicides (1999) as Adult Trip Fontaine
 Men of Means (1999) as Rico "Bullet" Burke
 Peril (2000) as Vincent
 Sanctimony (2000) as Jim Renart
 Space Fury (2000) as Konrad
 A Month of Sundays (2001) as Tomas McCabe
 Blackwoods (2002) as Sheriff Harding
 Heart of America (2002) as Will Prat
 Red Serpent (2003) as Steve Nichols
 Fate (2003) as Detective Cody Martin
 Starhunter (2000–2003) as Dante Montana
 Cold Case (2004) as Randy Price
 Gargoyle (2004) as Ty "Griff" Griffin
 Crash Landing (2005) as Captain Williams
 Komodo vs. Cobra (2005) as Mike A. Stoddard
 BloodRayne (2005) as Iancu
 Furnace (2006) as Detective Michael Turner
 Saurian (2006) as Jace Randall
 South Beach (2006) as Charlie Evans
 Seed (2007) as Detective Matt Bishop
 Polycarp (2007) as Detective Barry Harper
 Postal (2007) as Panhandler
 BloodRayne II: Deliverance (2007) as Pat Garrett
 Dark World (2008) as Harry
 Ninja Cheerleaders (2008) as Victor Lazzaro
 1968 Tunnel Rats (2008) as Sergeant Vic Hollowborn
 100 Feet (2008) as Mike Watson
 Road to Hell (2008) as Tom Cody
 Alone in the Dark II (2008) as Willson
 Far Cry (2008) as Paul Summers
 The Perfect Sleep (2009) as Officer Pavlovich
 1968: Tunnel Rats - Behind the Scenes (2009) as Sergeant Vic Hollowborn
 Direct Contact (2009) as Clive Connelly
 Rampage (2009) as Sheriff Melvoy
 Cool Dog (2009) as Dean Warner
 Job (2010) as Detective Remar
 Tales of an Ancient Empire (2010) as Oda
 Amphibious Creature of the Deep (original title: Amphibious 3D) (2010) as Jack Bowman
 Room and Board Blubberella (2011) as Commandant
 Bloodrayne: The Third Reich (2011) as Capt. Ekart Brand
 The Lincoln Lawyer (2011) as Detective Kurlen
 House (2011 TV show)
 The Philadelphia Experiment (2012) as Hagan
 Gone (2012) as Lieutenant Ray Bozeman
 Leverage (2012) as FBI Special Agent Dennis Powell (Season 4: Episode 17)
 Maximum Conviction (2012) as Chris Blake
 Assault on Wall Street (2013)
 Suddenly (2013)
 Real Gangsters (2013)
 How Sweet It Is (2013)
 The Big Fat Stone (2014)
 Bone Tomahawk (2015) as Mr. Wallington
 No Deposit (2015) as Mickey Ryan
 Sicilian Vampire (2015) as Sammy
 The Good, the Bad and the Dead (2015) as Sheriff Olson
 The Infiltrator (2016) as Barry Seal
 Traded (2016) as Clay Travis
 The Red Maple Leaf (2016)
 Nessie & Me (2016)
 Jason's Letter (2017)
 The Neighborhood (2017)
 Global Meltdown (2017)
 Battle of the Drones (2017) as Karl Kess
 Reborn (2018)
 A Christmas in Royal Fashion (2018)
 City of Lies (2018) as Varney
 Mayday (2019)
 Once Upon a Time in Deadwood (2019)
 Shark Island (2021) as Charlie
 Painkiller (2021) as Dr Alan Rhodes
 The Penthouse (2021)
 South of Heaven (2021) as Joey
 Renegades as Donovan
 The Beast Comes at Midnight  as Knight 
 Supersonic (TBA)
 Camp Pleasant Lake'' (TBA)

Awards and nominations

Awards
PollyGrind Film Festival
Best Actor: 2012

References

External links

 
 
 

1958 births
Living people
Male actors from New York City
American male film actors
American people of French-Canadian descent
American male television actors
People from Brooklyn
20th-century American male actors
21st-century American male actors